The 2023 MEAC women's basketball tournament is the postseason men's basketball tournament for the 2022–23 season in the Mid-Eastern Athletic Conference (MEAC). The tournament will take place during March 8–11, 2023. The tournament winner will receive the conference's automatic invitation to the 2023 NCAA Division I women's basketball tournament.

Seeds 
All 8 teams are eligible and will be seeded by record within the conference, with a tiebreaker system to seed teams with identical conference records.

Schedule

Bracket

References 

Tournament
MEAC women's basketball tournament
College basketball tournaments in Virginia
Basketball competitions in Norfolk, Virginia
MEAC women's basketball tournament
MEAC women's basketball tournament
Women's sports in Virginia